The Tipson–Cohen reaction is a name reaction first discovered by Stuart Tipson and Alex Cohen at the National Bureau of Standards in Washington D.C. The Tipson–Cohen reaction occurs when two neighboring secondary sulfonyloxy groups in a sugar molecule are treated with zinc dust (Zn) and sodium iodide (NaI) in a refluxing solvent such as N,N-dimethylformamide (DMF) to give an unsaturated carbohydrate.

Background
Unsaturated carbohydrates are desired as they are versatile building blocks that can be used in a variety of reactions. For example, they can be used as intermediates in the synthesis of natural products, or as dienophiles in the Diels-Alder reaction, or as precursors in the synthesis of oligosaccharides. The Tipson–Cohen reaction goes through a syn or anti elimination mechanism to produce an alkene in high to moderate yields. The reaction depends on the neighboring substituents. A mechanism for glucopyranosides and mannooyranosides is shown below.

Scheme 1: Syn elimination occurs with the glucopyranosides. Galactopyranosides follows a similar syn mechanism. Whereas, anti elimination occurs with mannopyranosides. Note that R could be a methanesulfonyl CH2O2S (Ms), or a toluenesulfonyl CH3C6H4O2S (Ts).

Reaction mechanism

Scheme 3: The scheme illustrates the first displacement, the rate determining step and slowest step, where the starting material is converted to the iodo-intermediate. The intermediate is not detectable as it is rapidly converted to the unsaturated sugar. Experiments with azide instead of the iodide confirmed attack occurs at the C-3 as nitrogen-intermediates were isolated. The order of reactivity from most reactive to least reactive is: β-glucopyranosides > β-mannopyranosides > α-glucopyranosides> α-mannopyranosides.

The reaction of β–mannopyranosides gives low yields and required longer reaction times than with β-glucopyranosides due to the presence of a neighboring axial substituent (sulfonyloxy) relative to C-3 sulfonyloxy group in the starting material. The axial substituent increases the steric interactions in the transition state, causing unfavorable eclipsing of the two sulfonyloxy groups. α-Glucopyranosides possess a β-trans-axial substituent relative to C-3 sulfonyloxy (anomeric OCH3 group) in the starting material. The β-trans-axial substituent influences the transition state by also causing an unfavorable steric interaction between the two groups. In the case of α-mannopyranosides, both a neighboring axial substituent (2-sulfonyloxy group) and a β-trans-axial substituent (anomeric OCH3 group) are present, therefore significantly increasing the reaction time and decreasing the yield.

Reaction conditions
Table 1: Reaction times and yield vary on the substrate. The β-glucopyranoside was found to be the best substrate for the Tipson–Cohen reaction as the reaction time and yield were much superior that any other substrate proposed in the study.

aSubstrates possess benzylidene protecting groups at C-4 and C-6, OMe groups at anomeric position and OTs groups at C-2 and C-3. Reaction temperature 95–100 ˚C

Reaction scope

The reaction has been attempted in the microwave, improving yields with the α-glucopyranoside to 88% and reducing the reaction time significantly to 14 minutes.
The original paper by Tipson and Cohen also used acyclic sugars to illustrate the utility of the reaction. Thus the reaction is not limited to cyclic carbohydrate derivatives.
Sulphonoxy groups such as methanesulfonyl and toluenesulfonyl were both used, however it was found that substrates with toluenesulfonyl groups gave higher yields and lower reaction times.

References

Carbohydrate chemistry
Organic reactions
Name reactions